Mellitella is a genus of echinoderms belonging to the family Mellitidae.

Species:

Mellitella californica 
Mellitella stokesii

References

Mellitidae
Echinoidea genera